Shuishang is a railway station on the Taiwan Railways Administration West Coast line located in Shuishang Township, Chiayi County, Taiwan.

History
The station was established on 20 April 1920.

See also
 List of railway stations in Taiwan

References

1920 establishments in Taiwan
Railway stations in Chiayi County
Railway stations opened in 1920
Railway stations served by Taiwan Railways Administration